Arthur William Alloo (9 January 1892 – 16 September 1950) played first-class cricket in New Zealand from 1913 to 1931. He worked as a schoolteacher.

Cricket career

Early career
Alloo made his first-class debut as an opening batsman for Otago in the 1913–14 season. In his second match he made 101 against Wellington in three hours out of a team total of 236.

He bowled little until 1918–19, when in a match against Southland he and Henry Holderness bowled unchanged throughout the match, Alloo taking 5 for 27 and 5 for 23. In his next match, in 1919–20, also against Southland, he took 6 for 20 in the second innings. A few days later, against Wellington, he scored 35 and 26 batting at number four, and bowled unchanged throughout the match, taking 6 for 63 and 4 for 96. According to Dick Brittenden, Alloo "dropped the ball on a length at slow-medium pace, and turned it from off".

Playing for New Zealand
In 1923–24 he was the leading wicket-taker in the Plunket Shield, with 24 wickets at an average of 25.25. In the final match against Wellington at Carisbrook, 1905 runs were scored over five days – which is still the seventh-highest aggregate in the history of first-class cricket. Wellington batted first and made 560 (Alloo 6 for 136), Otago replied with 385, Wellington made 465 in their second innings (Alloo 6 for 141), and Otago, needing 641 to win, were dismissed for 495. He played a match for New Zealand against the touring New South Wales team at the end of the season.

Alloo also played for New Zealand in 1924–25, this time two matches against Victoria. He toured Australia with the New Zealand team in 1925–26, playing all four matches against the state sides, but with little success. In all, in seven matches for New Zealand against Australian state teams he made 177 runs at 19.66, and took six wickets at 55.00.

Later career
He captained Otago from 1927–28 until his final matches in 1930–31, usually batting at seven or eight. He scored his second first-class century in 1928–29, batting at number eight against Wellington.

Personal life
Arthur Alloo attended Otago Boys' High School and the University of Otago. Like him, his brothers Albert and Cecil also played for Otago. The brothers were the grandsons of John Alloo, a Chinese-born businessman on the Ballarat goldfields, and his wife, née Margaret Peacock, who had come out from Scotland. John and Margaret moved to the Otago goldfields in 1868, where he was employed by the Otago Police Force as a constable-interpreter.

Arthur Alloo was a schoolteacher. He was appointed headmaster of the North-East Harbour School in Dunedin in 1932 and in the late 1930s he became the headmaster of Auckland Point School in the Nelson area, and later the headmaster of Nelson Central School.

As well as cricket he played soccer, fives, billiards, bowls and golf. He died suddenly while playing golf in Nelson. He was 58. His wife predeceased him.

References

External links
 

1892 births
1950 deaths
People educated at Otago Boys' High School
University of Otago alumni
New Zealand cricketers
Pre-1930 New Zealand representative cricketers
Otago cricketers
Australian emigrants to New Zealand
New Zealand schoolteachers
New Zealand people of Chinese descent
South Island cricketers